Smalls Hill is a mountain in Barnstable County, Massachusetts. Green Hill is located northwest and Corn Hill is located west of Smalls Hill.

References

Mountains of Massachusetts
Mountains of Barnstable County, Massachusetts